Geastrum coronatum is an inedible species of mushroom belonging to the genus Geastrum, or earthstar fungi. Christian Hendrik Persoon published the first description of Geastrum coronatum in 1801.

References

External links

SF  Species Fungorum
EoL Encyclopedia of Life
GBIF
CoL Catalogue of Life
BHL Bibliography of Geastrum coronatum at BHL
BioLib Taxonomy, description and photos
FirstNature Description and photos
nahuby.sk  Photos, map of distribution in Slovakia (in Slovak) 
mykologie.net Photo (in Czech) 
mykologie.eu Several photos (in Czech)
houbareni.cz Description and several photos (in Czech) 
grzyby.pl Description and several photos (in Polish) 
Mushroom Observer Photos

coronatum
Fungi described in 1801
Fungi of Europe
Inedible fungi
Taxa named by Christiaan Hendrik Persoon